is a correctional facility in Sawara-ku, Fukuoka. A part of the penal system of Japan, it is operated by the Ministry of Justice.

One of Japan's seven execution chambers is in this facility.

Notable prisoners
 Akira Nishiguchi (Hanged 11 December, 1970)
 Kiyohide Hayakawa (Hanged 6 July 2018)
 Yasunori Suzuki (Hanged 2 August 2019)
 Wei Wei (Hanged 26 December 2019)

References

Buildings and structures in Fukuoka
Prisons in Japan
Execution sites in Japan